Serge Leroy (14 May 1937 – 27 May 1993) was a French film director and screenwriter.

Selected filmography

References

External links
 

1937 births
1993 deaths
Film directors from Paris
French male screenwriters
20th-century French screenwriters
20th-century French male writers